Claud Cloete (born 17 February 1970) is a South African modern pentathlete. He competed in the men's individual event at the 1996 Summer Olympics.

References

1970 births
Living people
South African male modern pentathletes
Olympic modern pentathletes of South Africa
Modern pentathletes at the 1996 Summer Olympics
Place of birth missing (living people)